North Grove is an unincorporated community in Harrison Township, Miami County, in the U.S. state of Indiana.

History
North Grove was originally called Moorefield when it was laid out in 1854 by William North. The name was changed to North Grove at about the time the Pan Handle Railroad arrived into the town in 1867. A post office was established at North Grove in 1868, and remained in operation until it was discontinued in 1934.

Geography

References

Unincorporated communities in Miami County, Indiana
Unincorporated communities in Indiana